Dayrut al-Sharif ( "Dayrut the Noble",  Terōt Sarapamōn ) is a town in Egypt. It is located on the west bank of the Nile, in the Asyut Governorate. According to tradition, the Holy family visited Dayrut al-Sharif on their flight into Egypt.

History 
The older name of the town is Dayrut Sarabam which comes from the Coptic name of the town which in turn comes from the personal name Sarapamun. The Monastery of Abba Sarapamon is still in the town.

Climate 
Köppen-Geiger climate classification system classifies its climate as hot desert (BWh).

References 

Populated places in Asyut Governorate